Andrew John Hunter (born 3 June 1957) has been Dean of Grahamstown since 2008. He is also Archdeacon of Grahamstown.

Hunter was born in Pietermaritzburg and educated at the University of Cape Town, St Paul's College, Grahamstown, the University of the Western Cape, Cardiff University and the Nelson Mandela University where he obtained a DPhil in Conflict Management and Transformation in April 2019. Before being appointed dean he was rector of St Peter the Fisherman, Hout Bay.

Hunter sits on the councils of

 St. Andrew's College, Grahamstown
 The College of the Transfiguration
 The Biko Bowcott Charitable Trust Foundation

Family
His paternal grandfather was John Hunter, bishop of George, having been translated from Kimberley and Kuruman.

Notes 

1957 births
People from Pietermaritzburg
University of Cape Town alumni
Alumni of Cardiff University
Nelson Mandela University alumni
Deans of Grahamstown
Anglican archdeacons in Africa
Living people
20th-century South African Anglican priests
21st-century South African Anglican priests
St Paul's College, Grahamstown alumni